The Coat of arms of Aruba was originally designed in Amsterdam in 1955. Since then, it has been in use as the national symbol of Aruba. The symbol has seven main elements:  
The lion crest symbolizes power and generosity.
A white Cross divides the shield into quarters, and represents devotion and faith.
In the first quarter is an aloe plant, the island's first important export.
In the second quarter, Hooiberg, Aruba's most recognizable and second highest hill, represents Aruba rising out of the sea.
The third quarter depicts hands shaking, symbolizing Aruba's good relations with the world.
In the fourth quarter, a cogwheel represents industry.
Below the shield is a pair of laurel branches, traditional symbols of peace and friendship.

Blazon 
Shield: quartered by a cross Argent, the first Azure an aloe plant Or, the second Or the Hooiberg hill Vert issuant from barry wavy sea of Azure and Argent, the third Or two dexter hands Gules shaking each other fesswise, the fourth Gules an Argent cogwheel

Crest: a lion couchant Gules

Supporters: a pair of laurel branches Vert, tied at the bottom

References

External links
 Coat of arms of Aruba In The World All Countries Coat of arms

 

National symbols of Aruba
Aruba
Aruba
Aruba
Aruba
Aruba
Aruba
Aruba